Paul Heatley (born 30 June 1987) is a footballer from Northern Ireland who plays as a winger for Crusaders. Heatley previously played for Cliftonville, Newry City, Brantwood and Carrick Rangers before joining Crusaders in 2013. He was named as Ulster Footballer of the Year and Northern Ireland Football Writers' Player of the Year for 2014–15.

Honours
Crusaders
NIFL Premiership: 2014–15, 2015–16, 2017–18
Irish Cup: 2018–19, 2021–22
County Antrim Shield: 2017–18, 2018–19
Individual
Ulster Footballer of the Year: 2014–15
Northern Ireland Football Writers' Association Player of the Year: 2014–15

References

Association footballers from Northern Ireland
Carrick Rangers F.C. players
Crusaders F.C. players
NIFL Premiership players
Ulster Footballers of the Year
Northern Ireland Football Writers' Association Players of the Year
Living people
Cliftonville F.C. players
Newry City F.C. players
Brantwood F.C. players
1987 births
Association football wingers